The historic Buddha or Gautama Buddha, is considered the ninth avatar among the ten major avatars of the god Vishnu, according to the Vaishnava tradition of Hinduism.

The Buddha has been a formative force in the origins of Hinduism. Regional Hindu texts over the centuries have presented a spectrum of views on Buddhism, possibly reflecting the competition between Buddhism and the Brahmanical traditions. In contemporary Hinduism, the Buddha is revered by Hindus who usually consider "Buddhism to be another form of Hinduism". Other Hindus reject the identification of Gautama Buddha as an avatar of Vishnu, referring to the texts of the Puranas and identifying the two as different individuals.

Avatar of Vishnu

The Buddha was integrated into Vaishnavism through its mythology in the Vaishnava Puranas, where the Buddha is adopted as the ninth avatar of Vishnu. According to the Agni Purana, Vishnu assumed this incarnation on earth due to the daityas defeating the devas in their battles. In order to restore the natural order, he deluded the asuras with his teachings. This caused them to abandon the path established by the Vedas and convert to Buddhism, causing them to be devoid of dharma. This caused them to become dasyus at the end of the Kali Yuga, causing them to be cast off to hell, devoid of good conduct. Furthermore, it causes the age to be characterised by the intermixture of the varnas and domination by the Mlecchas, barbarian and foreign forces. Subsequently, according to tradition, it became the responsibility of Adi Shankaracharya and future Vaishnava acharyas to re-establish theism.

Chronology
The adoption of the Buddha in texts relating to Hindu gods, and of Hindu gods in Buddhist texts, is difficult to place chronologically. According to Doniger, the myth of the Buddha avatar first appeared in the pre-Gupta period, when orthodox Brahminism was threatened by the rise of Buddhism and Jainism, and by foreign invaders. According to Doniger, "Hindus came to regard the Buddha as an avatar of Vishnu between A.D. 450 and the sixth century," first appearing in the Vishnu Purana (400-500 CE). According to John Holt, "The replacement of the Buddha as the "cosmic person" within the mythic ideology of Indian kingship [...] occurred at about the same time the Buddha was incorporated and subordinated within the Brahmanical cult of Vishnu."

In Literature
The Buddha is mentioned as an avatar of Vishnu in the Puranas and the epics such as:
Harivamsa (1.41)
Vishnu Purana (3.18)
Bhagavata Purana (1.3.24, 2.7.37, 11.4.22)
Garuda Purana (1.1, 2.30.37, 3.15.26)
Agni Purana (16, 49.8)
Naradiya Purana (2.72)
Linga Purana (1.71)
Padma Purana (3.252)

Another important scripture that mentions him as an avatar is Parashara's Brihat Parashara Hora Shastra (2:1-5/7).

Buddha as an avatar of Vishnu is part of a cosmic cycle, in which the dharma is destroyed in the Kali Yuga, and then restored again in the Satya Yuga, when Vishnu incarnates as Kalki. The Bhavishya Purana incorporates historical facts about dynastical lineages, stating the following: 

Some pre-13th-century Hindu texts, such as the Bhagavata Purana, portray the Buddha as born to lead the asuras, who oppressed the people, away from the Vedic rituals, which they were not worthy to perform. Bhagavata Purana 1.3.24:

In the Skanda Purana, the Buddha is stated to be one of the incarnations of Vasudeva, and begin enchanting the universe, causing righteousness to dissipate and immorality to prevail:

His father is usually called Śuddhodhana, which is consistent with the Buddhist tradition, while in a few places the Buddha's father is named Añjana or Jina. This is due to the fact that in some texts both Buddhism and Jainism are used by Vishnu to mislead the demons, and a confusion of names and doctrines appears, when the Buddha is called the son of Jina, mistakingly mimicking Buddhist texts which refer to the Buddha as Jina (conqueror), a term more often used in Jainism.

Other texts portray him in a more positive way, as born to stop all killing of animals. Only a few statements mention the worship of Buddha, e.g. the Varahapurana states that one desirous of beauty should worship him, Some pre-14th-century Hindu temples include Buddha reliefs with the same reverence they show for other avatars of Vishnu, but though an avatar of Vishnu, the Buddha is rarely worshipped like Krishna and Rama in Hinduism.

Assimilation of Buddhist influences
The adoption of Buddha may also have been a way to assimilate aspects of Buddhism into the fold of Hinduism. According to Wendy Doniger, "Helmuth von Glasenapp attributed these developments to a Hindu desire to absorb Buddhism in a peaceful manner, both to win Buddhists to Vaishnavism and also to account for the fact that such a significant heresy could exist in India."

According to Donald Swearer, the understanding of Buddha in Hinduism is a part of his wider and diverse influences. Even within Buddhism, states Swearer, Buddha and his ideas are conceptualized differently between Theravada, Mahayana, Tibetan, Japanese and other traditions. Similarly, in various traditions of Hinduism (and elsewhere), Buddha is accepted and interpreted in different ways.

Syncretism
Much like Hinduism's adoption of the Buddha as an avatar, Buddhism legends too adopted Krishna in their Jataka tales, claiming Krishna (Vishnu avatar) to be a character whom Buddha met and taught in his previous births. According to Alf Hiltebeitel and other scholars, some of the stories in Buddha-related Jataka tales found in Pali texts seem slanderous distortions of Hindu legends, but these may reflect the ancient local traditions and the complexities of early interaction between the two Indian religions.

While the Buddhist Jataka texts co-opt Krishna-Vasudeva and make him a student of the Buddha in his previous life, the Hindu texts co-opt the Buddha and make him an avatar of Vishnu.
Similarly, in Dasaratha Jataka Buddha identifies himself as Rama.

Rejection
Buddhists traditionally do not accept the Buddha to be a Vishnu avatar. B. R. Ambedkar, the Dalit leader who in 1935 declared his intention to convert from Hinduism to Buddhism and converted about 20 years later, rejected the belief that Buddha was an incarnation of Vishnu.

Some contemporary Hindus also reject the identification of Gautama Buddha as an avatar of Vishnu, referring to the texts of the Puranas. Gurus of the Gaudiya Vaishnava theology argue that in Bhagavata Purana (1.3.24), "son of Ajana," refers to the Vishnu avatar born to Ajana (c.1800 BCE, according to Stephen Knapp) while Gautama was born to Maya and Śuddodhana. They further argue that epithets for the Buddha like Sugata Buddha and Adi Buddha refer to the Vishnu avatar, not to Gautama Buddha, based on Amarakosha and other Buddhist texts.

In 1999, Śaṅkarācārya of Kanchi, Śrī Jayendra Sarasvatī had released a joint statement with Vipassanācharya S. N. Goenka and declared that:in order to foster friendlier ties between the two communities [the Vedic and Śramaṇa traditions] we decide that whatever has happened in the past (cannot be undone, but) should be forgotten and such beliefs [on the Buddha being an avatāra of Vishnu] should not be propagated. Shankaracharya of Govardhan Peeth, Swami Shri Nischalanada Saraswati, too has stated that the Buddha avatar of Vishnu and Gautama Buddha were different persons.

Iconography 
The Agni Purana describes how the figure of the Buddha should be represented:

Contemporary reverence 

Buddha is considered a holy being and revered as one who was awakened in India. Outside India, some contemporary Hindus revere the Buddha along with other gods during their festivals.

Prominent modern proponents of Hinduism, such as Sarvepalli Radhakrishnan and Swami Vivekananda, consider the Buddha as an example of the same universal truth that underlies religions. A number of revolutionary figures in modern Hinduism, including Mahatma Gandhi, have been inspired by the life and teachings of the Buddha and many of his attempted reforms. Steven Collins sees such Hindu claims regarding Buddhism as part of an effort - itself a reaction to Christian proselytizing efforts in India - to show that "all religions are one", and that Hinduism is uniquely valuable because it alone recognizes this fact.

Some Hindus usually consider "Buddhism to be another form of Hinduism." Various scholars in India, Sri Lanka and outside South Asia state that the colonial era and contemporary attempts to assimilate Buddha into the Hindu fold are a nationalistic political agenda, where "the Buddha has been reclaimed triumphantly as a symbol of indigenous nationalist understandings of India's history and culture".

According to Lars Tore Flåten, Hindu perceptions, particularly in the literature by Hindu nationalists, are that "Buddha did not break away from the spiritual ideas of his age and country," claiming that scholars such as Hermann Oldenberg (1854-1920), Thomas Rhys Davids (1843-1922) and Sarvepalli Radhakrishnan (1888-1975) state there is much in common between "Buddhism and the contemporary Hinduism." Yet, in present-day scholarly consensus, Buddhism is considered to be very different from pre-Buddhist Indian religion.

See also
 Buddhism and Hinduism
 Dashavatara
 Vaishnavism

Notes

Subnotes

References

Sources
Printed sources

 
 

 

 

 
 
 
 

 

 

 

 

 
 
 

Web-sources

External links

Buddhism and Hinduism
Avatars of Vishnu
Gautama Buddha